Moyna Macgill (born Charlotte Lillian McIldowie; 10 December 1895 – 25 November 1975) was an northern Irish actress from Belfast and the mother of actress Angela Lansbury and producers Edgar and Bruce Lansbury. In 2020, she was listed at number 35 on The Irish Times list of Ireland's greatest film actors.

Early life
Born Charlotte Lillian McIldowie at 42 Eglantine Avenue in south Belfast, she was the daughter of William McIldowie and Elizabeth Jane (née Mageean). Her father was a wealthy solicitor of Scottish parentage who was a director of the Grand Opera House in Belfast, a position that sparked her interest in theatrics.

Career
As a teenager she was noticed riding the London Underground by director and producer George Pearson, who cast her in several of his films. In 1918, she made her stage debut in the play Love is a Cottage at the West End theatres Globe Theatre. Encouraged by Sir Gerald du Maurier to change her name to Moyna Macgill (which invariably was misspelt as "MacGill" or "McGill", and on at least one occasion, the film Texas, Brooklyn & Heaven, as "Magill"), she became a leading actress of the day, appearing in light comedies, melodramas, and classics opposite Herbert Marshall, John Gielgud, and Basil Rathbone, among others.

Twenty-six-year-old Macgill was married with a three-year-old daughter, Isolde (who later married Sir Peter Ustinov), when she became involved romantically with Edgar Lansbury, a socialist politician, who was a son of the Labour MP and Leader of the Opposition George Lansbury. Her husband, actor Reginald Denham, named Lansbury as co-respondent when he filed for divorce. A year after it was finalized, Macgill and Lansbury married and with Isolde settled into a garden flat in London's Regent's Park.

Macgill temporarily set aside her career following the birth of daughter Angela and twin sons Edgar, Jr., and Bruce (both went on to become Broadway producers, but Bruce is better known for his work on television, such as the series The Wild Wild West, Mission: Impossible, and his sister's Murder, She Wrote), although music and dance were prevalent in their upbringing. When they moved into a larger house in suburban Mill Hill, she turned their home into a salon for actors, writers, directors, musicians, and artists, all of whom left an impression on young Angela and were instrumental in directing her interests towards acting.

Family
MacGill's daughter Angela Lansbury, after having featured in a number of musicals from 1940 to the 1960s, would become a popular stage and film actress in her own right, starring in the long-running television series Murder, She Wrote.

In 1935, Edgar Lansbury died of stomach cancer, a year after publishing a biography of his father George. Macgill began an affair with Scotsman Leckie Forbes, a former colonel with the British Army in India. The two moved their respective families to a house in Hampstead, but Macgill soon discovered Forbes' military career had made him a staunch disciplinarian who ruled the household like a tyrant.

When the opportunity to take her children to the U.S. presented itself just prior to The Blitz, she spirited them away under cover of night. She never spoke to Forbes again. In New York City, Macgill was unable to work in movies or on the stage, not having a work visa, and she took to presenting dramatic readings at private schools for income.

In 1942, she was invited to join a troupe that was rehearsing Noël Coward's Tonight at 8.30 for a touring production designed to raise funds for the Royal Canadian Air Force. She accepted, and when the company finished the run in Vancouver, she headed to Hollywood to seek work there. She soon sent for Angela, and eventually, the twins and the family settled in Laurel Canyon.

Hollywood career
Her career in Hollywood consisted largely of small character parts in films and on television. Among her more notable film credits are Frenchman's Creek and The Picture of Dorian Gray (which co-starred her daughter Angela). In later years she made guest appearances on such television series as Studio One, The Twilight Zone, Dr. Kildare, Mister Ed and My Favorite Martian.

Death
She died of esophageal cancer in Los Angeles, aged 79.

Roles

Film

Stage
The Way (1928)

References

Footnotes

External links

1895 births
1975 deaths
British film actresses
Silent film actresses from Northern Ireland
British stage actresses
British television actresses
Irish film actresses
Irish people of Scottish descent
Irish silent film actresses
Irish stage actresses
Irish television actresses
Actresses from Belfast
Deaths from esophageal cancer
Deaths from cancer in California
20th-century Irish actresses
British expatriate actresses in the United States
Lansbury family
British salon-holders